Time to Say Goodbye may refer to:

"Time to Say Goodbye" (Andrea Bocelli and Sarah Brightman song), a version of Andrea Bocelli's song "Con te partirò" with Sarah Brightman
Time to Say Goodbye (album), a 1997 album by Sarah Brightman
Time to Say Goodbye?, a 1997 American film
 "Time to Say Goodbye" (Antique song), 2003
 "Natsu no Yuu-utsu (Time to Say Good-bye)", a 1995 song by L'Arc-en-Ciel

See also
Every Time We Say Goodbye (disambiguation)